Veitchia simulans is a species of flowering plant in the family Arecaceae. It is found only in Fiji. It is threatened by habitat loss.

References

simulans
Endemic flora of Fiji
Vulnerable plants
Taxonomy articles created by Polbot